The Election Bloc Liudmyla Suprun – Ukrainian Regional Asset,, sometimes translated as Ukrainian Regional Activists is a political alliance in Ukraine led by Liudmyla Suprun.

The bloc had been organized in August 2007 for participation in the 2007 parliamentary election. At the 2007 parliamentary elections it party failed to enter the parliament.

The Bloc consisted of:

 Popular Democratic Party
 Democratic Party of Ukraine
 Republican Christian Party

References

Political party alliances in Ukraine